Jamides pura, the white cerulean, is a butterfly in the family Lycaenidae. It was described by Frederic Moore in 1886. It is found in the Indomalayan realm.

Subspecies
Jamides pura pura (Sikkim, Assam to Sumatra)
Jamides pura zebrina (Fruhstorfer, 1916) (Nias)
Jamides pura parazebra (Fruhstorfer, 1916) (Java)
Jamides pura spitamenes (Fruhstorfer, 1916) (Obi)
Jamides pura eordaea (Fruhstorfer, 1916) (Palawan)
Jamides pura tenus (Fruhstorfer, 1916) (Borneo)
Jamides pura juliana (van Eecke, 1914) (Simalue)
Jamides pura babinus Takanami, 1990 (Babi)

References

External links

Jamides at Markku Savela's Lepidoptera and Some Other Life Forms

Jamides
Butterflies described in 1886